Rosewater Limited Liability Company is a homeless advocacy organization founded in Cleveland, Ohio in the late 90s by Clark David "Cody" Campbell.  Its original manifesto stated that the organization's mission was to "liberate" abandoned buildings for use by the homeless.

In a show of support for the homeless, on December 22, 1999, Rosewater's Campbell enlisted the help of "Food not Bombs" to erect a tent city on public square to protest of the Mayor's policies.

Campbell, a Vietnam era veteran and former marine, had frequently advocated against the shelters, preferring a variant of legalized squatting, which he referred to as the "requisitioning of abandoned buildings."

Mayor White visited the site of the protest on public square and surveyed the motley erection of tents from his vantage point at Stouffer's Hotel, located across the street, in the Terminal Tower complex.  He talked to reporters and appeared on television in an effort to reassure the public, and maintain calm.  After Mayor White had left the downtown demonstration, police stormed the square and arrested all present.

The exposure and public sympathy brought about in tandem by the initial arrests coupled with the ACLU response, and the tent protest with its arrests, helped to sway public opinion, and lead to cessation of the unpopular "sweeping the streets" policy.

Rosewater, since November 2008, has been registered with the state of Ohio as a not for profit limited liability company.

References 

Homelessness organizations
Homelessness in the United States
Political advocacy groups in the United States
Organizations based in Cleveland
Housing in Ohio